Little Island is a partially submerged marsh island in the Napa Slough, branching off from the Napa River upstream of San Pablo Bay (an embayment of San Francisco Bay). It is almost entirely in Napa County, California, although part of its southern tip is in Solano County; it is managed as part of the Napa-Sonoma Marshes Wildlife Area.

References

Islands of Napa County, California
Islands of Solano County, California
Islands of Northern California
San Pablo Bay